The 2013 All-Ireland Senior Ladies' Football Championship Final featured  and . This was the third of three All-Ireland Ladies' football finals between 2008 and 2013 that saw Cork play Monaghan. They had also met in the 2011 final. Cork claimed their eighth All-Ireland title in nine years after they got the better of Monaghan by 1–10 to 1–9. Cork led 1–6 to 0–6 at half-time thanks to a Valerie Mulcahy goal. A second half penalty goal from their goalkeeper, Linda Martin, helped Monaghan lead by a point with eight minutes remaining but Juliet Murphy and Mulcahy added late points as Cork edged it by a solitary point. The match was broadcast live on TG4.

Route to the Final

Match info

Teams

References

 
All-Ireland Senior Ladies' Football Championship Finals
Cork county ladies' football team matches
Monaghan county ladies' football team matches
All-Ireland Senior Ladies' Football Championship Final
All-Ireland Senior Ladies' Football Championship Final, 2013